Chung Nan-fei (born 12 January 1928) was a Taiwanese weightlifter. He competed at the 1964 Summer Olympics and the 1968 Summer Olympics.

References

External links
 

1928 births
Possibly living people
Taiwanese male weightlifters
Olympic weightlifters of Taiwan
Weightlifters at the 1964 Summer Olympics
Weightlifters at the 1968 Summer Olympics
Weightlifters at the 1966 Asian Games
Asian Games competitors for Chinese Taipei
20th-century Taiwanese people